Margadarshi is a 1969 Indian Kannada-language film directed by M. R. Vittal and produced by Srikanth Patel and Srikanth Nahatha. The film stars Rajkumar, Chandrakala, T. N. Balakrishna and Narasimharaju. The film has musical score by M. Ranga Rao. The film is based on a novel of the same name by T. R. Subba Rao. This was the first Kannada movie to be shot in Abhiman Studio.

Cast

Soundtrack
The music was composed by M. Ranga Rao.

References

External links
 
 

1960s Kannada-language films
Films scored by M. Ranga Rao
Films directed by M. R. Vittal